Richard David Wild (born 23 May 1973) is a former English cricketer. Wild was a right-handed batsman who bowled right-arm fast-medium. He was born in Barnsley, Yorkshire.

Wild made a single first-class appearance for Northamptonshire against Oxford University in 1996. In this match he took a single wicket, that of Hasnain Malik for the cost of 62 runs from 14 overs. He wasn't called upon to bat.

References

External links
Richard Wild at ESPNcricinfo

1973 births
Living people
Cricketers from Barnsley
English cricketers
Northamptonshire cricketers
English cricketers of 1969 to 2000